The Duchess of Richmond is the wife of the Duke of Richmond, an extant title in the Peerage of England that has been created four times, originally in 1525.

Countesses

Countesses of Richmond (1218–1235)
Other titles: Duchess of Brittany

Countesses of Richmond (1341–1342)
Other titles: Countess of Beaumont

Countesses of Richmond (1342–1372)
Other titles: Duchess of Lancaster

Countesses of Richmond (1372–1425)
Other titles: Duchess of Brittany

Countesses of Richmond (1414–1435)
Other titles: Duchess of Bedford

Countesses of Richmond (1452–1509)

Duchesses

Duchesses of Richmond & Somerset (1525–1536)

Duchesses of Richmond (1623–1624)

Duchesses of Richmond (1641–1672)

Duchesses of Richmond (1675–Present)

English duchesses by marriage